Barbary-Coast Bunny is a 1956 Warner Bros. Looney Tunes cartoon short directed by Chuck Jones and written by Tedd Pierce. The short was released on July 21, 1956, and stars Bugs Bunny.

Plot
Bugs is tunneling the cross country to meet his cousin Herman in San Francisco, only to run head first into a boulder which is actually a large nugget of gold.  Bugs is considering how to keep the gold safe; Nasty Canasta sees this and sets up a simple stand claiming to be a banker who can safely store Bugs' gold. Bugs falls for the ruse. When Bugs decides to ask for his gold back, Canasta claims that the bank is closing and traps Bugs in the folded-up stand while he rides away with the gold. Wrathfully, Bugs vows revenge on Nasty Canasta by saying: "You realize that this is not going to go unchallenged."

Six months later, Canasta has used his ill-gotten gains to start a casino in San Francisco, which is shamelessly rigged in the house's favor. Bugs enters the casino in the role, playing a hopelessly naïve country boy who confuses a slot machine for a "telly-o-phone". When Bugs uses it to phone his mother for some money, he hits the jackpot, much to Canasta's shock. In an attempt to recoup this loss, Canasta convinces Bugs to stay for a game and thinks that he is maneuvering the apparently easy mark into playing a game of roulette on the pretense of it being a game of marbles. To build his would-be victim's confidence, Canasta arranges for Bugs to win on his first spin. But Bugs develops a winning streak on the same number (#23). To recoup his losses, Canasta covers #23 with a block of wood and sets the wheel up for the marble to stop on #00.  When it does, he laughs and strikes the table in triumph, causing the ball to bounce on and hammer through a knot in the wood block, giving Bugs another win.

Determined to get back Bugs’ now massive winnings, Canasta convinces Bugs to try playing draw poker and Bugs literally draws a picture of a fireplace poker. Bugs then pretends to misinterpret Canasta's description of the importance of having the biggest hand to win by blowing his glove into a giant balloon. Canasta loses his temper at his would-be victim's obtuseness ("CUT IT OUT, CAN'T YA?!"). Bugs threatens to walk out, forcing Canasta to grovel in order to coax Bugs to return to the game. After staking all his money, Bugs promptly wins with a Four of a Kind consisting of Aces ("All I got is two pair: a pair of ones, and another pair of ones"), trumping Canasta's Full House.

With his casino's bank broken at the hands of this simpleton who seems physically incapable of losing, Canasta decides to rob Bugs at gunpoint on the pretense of it being another game of chance, namely Russian roulette. Bugs, still keeping in character, naïvely spins the revolver bullet cylinder like a slot machine and a mass of coins inexplicably pours out the gun's barrel.

As Bugs departs with all the casino's funds and more, Canasta greedily tries to win money from his gun, only to shoot himself in the attempt and collapse. Bugs pops in and says to the audience: "The moral of this story is: 'Don't try to steal no 18 karats [carrots] from no rabbit" shaking his head and swirling his eyebrows.

Home media
The short is available on Stars of Space Jam: Bugs Bunny VHS, and on both the fourth volume of the Looney Tunes Golden Collection DVDs and the second volume of the Looney Tunes Platinum Collection DVDs.

References

External links

 

1956 films
1956 animated films
1956 short films
Looney Tunes shorts
Warner Bros. Cartoons animated short films
Short films directed by Chuck Jones
Films set in San Francisco
1956 comedy films
Barbary Coast, San Francisco
Films scored by Carl Stalling
Bugs Bunny films
Films about gambling
1950s Warner Bros. animated short films
Films produced by Edward Selzer
1950s English-language films